The Control and Automation Student Society is a non-profit, non-governmental, non-political student society established in 2004, formed by ITU, mostly from Faculty of Electrical and Electronics Engineering students. It has more than 600 members in both Electrical and Electronics Faculty as well as Astronautics and Aeronautics Faculty, Science and Letters Faculty and others.

Organizations

	The primary organization that is organized by Istanbul Technical University Control and Automation Student Society is ITU Robotic Olympics(ITURO). While ITURO is celebrating its 6th year in 2011, ongoing mission of gathering robotic enthusiasts together, and hosting a huge number of competitors, audience and media. Istanbul Technical University Control and Automation Student Society was one of the organizers of Automatic Control National Conference in cooperate with Turkish National Committee of Automatic Control(TOK) in 2008. In 2010, OTOKON was also organized ICM(International Conference of Mechatronics) which is held by IEEE. For this cooperation and organization OTOKON has received an award from IEEE. In 2011, OTOKON nominated for best Student Society by ITU Student Societies Association.

Awards

Society's members have participated in inter-disciplinary projects that are held in ITU. Notable examples are; our members have won CanSat Competition that was held by American Institute of Aeronautics and Astronautics(AIAA) and American Astronomical Society(AAS) in United States, also they won Board of European Students of Technology's competition of engineering in Turkey, nominated for 3rd position in the Solar Splash Competition with Solar powered boat, as well as participate in the solar powered car(ARIBA), hydrogen powered car(HYDROBEE) projects. Furthermore, they enroll in the many international competitions like; RoboCup, Euroskills, Worldskills and Imagine Cup.

See also
 Istanbul Technical University, One of the leading Technical University of Turkey
 ITU IEEE Student Branch, Similar Student Society in ITU

References

External links
 OTOKON Website
 OTOKON Member Forum
 ITURO Website
 Istanbul Technical University Website 

Student organizations established in 2004
Student organizations in Turkey
Engineering societies based in Turkey